Gibson Norrie McNaughton (30 July 1911 – 1971) was a Scottish professional footballer who played primarily as an inside forward, but also as a left-half.

McNaughton began his career in the Junior leagues with Dundee Violet before moving to the Scottish Football League with Clyde, Dundee and Dunfermline Athletic. In 1936 he transferred to English side Nottingham Forest, where he spent three years, scoring 12 goals in 66 English Football League matches during that time. McNaughton signed for city rivals Notts County in 1939, but football in England was abandoned shortly afterwards due to the outbreak of the Second World War.

After the war ended, McNaughton joined non-league side Ilkeston Town. He made 74 appearances for the club and scored 22 goals. During the 1949–50 season, he had a spell as player–manager of Ilkeston before leaving in the summer of 1950.

References

1911 births
1991 deaths
Footballers from Dundee
Scottish footballers
Association football inside forwards
Clyde F.C. players
Dundee F.C. players
Dunfermline Athletic F.C. players
Nottingham Forest F.C. players
Notts County F.C. players
Ilkeston Town F.C. (1945) players
Scottish Football League players
English Football League players
Scottish football managers
Ilkeston Town F.C. managers
Dundee Violet F.C. players
People from Broughty Ferry